Phoenician metal bowls are approximately 90 decorative bowls made in the 7th–8th centuries BCE from bronze, silver and gold (often in the form of electrum), found since the mid-19th century in the Eastern Mediterranean and Iraq. They were historically attributed to the Phoenicians, but are today considered to have been made by a broader group of Levantine peoples.

The first bowls published widely had been discovered by Austen Henry Layard in 1849 in the palace of Ashurnasirpal II at Nimrud. The discovery of these bowls began not just the known corpus of Phoenician metal bowls, but according to Nicholas Vella: "effectively gave birth to Phoenician art as a style, a definition with which historians of art still largely concur." They are foundational artefacts in the study of Phoenician art, together with the Nimrud ivories, which were discovered at the same time but identified as Phoenician a few years later. However, both the bowls and the ivories pose a significant challenge as no examples of either – or any other artefacts with equivalent features – have been found in Phoenicia or other major colonies (e.g. Carthage, Malta, Sicily). The whole corpus was studied in detail by Glenn Markoe in 1985.

The bowls contain hunting, battle, and animal scenes with clear influence from Assyrian and Egyptian art. They are thought to have been made using repoussé and chasing, as well as embossing, metalworking techniques.

Discovery and identification

Nimrud bowls 

The first bowls of this type published widely were discovered in Nimrud in 1849 by Austen Henry Layard, a number of which contained short inscriptions in the Phoenician alphabet. Layard described them as follows, identifying them as Phoenician with reference to the Biblical stories of Hiram I, who was described as a skilled bronzeworker, and the Sidonian silver mixing bowl described in book 23 of Homer's Iliad:
The embossed and engraved vessels from Nimroud afford many interesting illustrations of the progress made by the ancients in metallurgy. From the Egyptian character of the designs, and especially of the drapery of the figures, in several of the specimens, it may be inferred that some of them were not Assyrian, but had been brought from a foreign people. As in the ivories, however, the workmanship, subjects, and mode of treatment are more Assyrian than Egyptian, and seem to show that the artist either copied from Egyptian models, or was a native of a country under the influence of the arts and taste of Egypt.

The Sidonians, and other inhabitants of the Phœnician coast, were the most renowned workers in metal of the ancient world, and their intermediate position between the two great nations, by which they were alternately invaded and subdued, may have been the cause of the existence of a mixed art amongst them. In the Homeric poems they are frequently mentioned as the artificers who fashioned and embossed metal cups and bowls, and Solomon sought cunning men from Tyre to make the gold and brazen utensils for his temple and palaces. It is, therefore, not impossible that the vessels discovered at Nimroud were the work of Phœnician artists, brought expressly from Tyre, or carried away amongst the captives when their cities were taken by the Assyrians, who, we know from many passages in the Bible, always secured the smiths and artizans, and placed them in their own immediate dominions.

They may have been used for sacrificial purposes, at royal banquets, or when the king performed certain religious ceremonies, for in the bas-reliefs he is frequently represented on such occasions with a cup or bowl in his hand; or they may have formed part of the spoil of some Syrian nation, placed in a temple at Nineveh, as the holy utensils of the Jews, after the destruction of the sanctuary, were kept in the temple of Babylon. It is not, indeed, impossible, that some of them may have been actually brought from the cities round Jerusalem by Sennacherib himself, or from Samaria by Shalmaneser or Sargon, who, we find, inhabited the palace at Nimroud, and of whom several relics have already been discovered in the ruins.

Four of the bowls with inscriptions were published in the second volume of Corpus Inscriptionum Semiticarum: CIS II 1.46 (British Museum ID: N.619), CIS II 1.47 (N.50), CIS II 1.48 (N.14), CIS II 1.49 (N.19).

Cyprus bowls 

At around the same time, twelve silver bowls of a similar nature were found in Cyprus. Ten of the bowls were lost, and presumed to have been melted down for their metal. The two remaining were acquired by antiquities dealers, and later were – separately – given to the Louvre.

Layard claimed a connection between the Nimrud and Cyprus bowls in his books.

Etruscan tombs 

The first Phoenician bowls were uncovered in modern times were in 1836 at the Regolini-Galassi tomb in the Banditaccia Necropolis of Cerveteri, about 50 km north of Rome, and were published by Luigi Grifi in 1841. However, these were not widely known at the time of Layard's 1849 discoveries in Nimrud, and the specific connection to the Phoenician bowls was only made in 1876 following the discovery of the Bernardini Tomb.

In 1855 and 1876, two ancient tombs were uncovered in Palestrina (ancient Praeneste), around 30 km east of Rome – the Barberini Tomb and the Bernardini Tomb. They contained a number of silver bowls, including one with a detailed Phoenician inscription that was published a few years later as CIS I 164. Following the Bernardini tomb discovery, archaeologist Wolfgang Helbig published a letter he had written to Sardinian antiquarian and politician Giovanni Spano, who had himself published the Pauli Gerrei trilingual inscription about 15 years previously. The letter was entitled Notes on Phoenician Art, and included a detailed survey of all the Phoenician metal bowls that had been found to date.

Today many of the bowls from Etruscan tombs are at the Museo Gregoriano Etrusco in the Vatican.

Gallery

Notes

References

Further reading 
 
 
 (regarding a bowl at the Fondation Hardt pour l’Étude de l’Antiquité Classique)
 Histoire de l'art dans l'antiquité: Égypte, Assyrie, Perse, Asie Mineure, Grece, Etrurie, Rome, Perrot, Georges; Chipiez, Charles
 Der Orient und die frühgriechische Kunst, Poulsen, Frederik

Phoenician metalwork